Total World Tour is the fifth concert tour by English recording artist Joss Stone. The tour lasted 6 years, with Stone expressing her intent to play in every country on Earth, and mostly succeeded in her goal, even reaching countries such as North Korea, Yemen and Iraq. It began in Casablanca, Morocco on 29 March 2014, and ended prematurely in Barcelona, Spain on 3 July 2019. The tour would've ended on 4 July 2019 in Kish Island, Iran, but upon entry to the country, Stone was deported, as authorities believed her concert would be public. Along with the concerts, on each day of the tour, Stone met and sang with local musicians and volunteered with local charities. To respect the culture, Stone wore a hijab when visiting various Middle Eastern countries, even when it wasn't legally required. In order to perform in Syria, Stone crossed into the country illegally. American India Arie joined as a support act for the first Oceania leg.

Deportation from Iran 
Joss Stone was scheduled to conclude the Total World Tour on 4 July 2019 with a private concert in Iran. However, upon arrival to Kish International Airport, Stone was detained by authorities who believed her concert would be public. In Iran, it is illegal for women to perform public concerts because Shia Muslim clerics believe that "a woman's singing voice can be erotic". Stone was aware of this law, and was quoted saying "We were aware there couldn’t be a public concert as I am a woman and that is illegal in this country. Personally I don’t fancy going to an Iranian prison nor am I trying to change the politics of the countries I visit nor do I wish to put other people in danger." She later claimed that the people in immigration treated her "...the best [she had] experienced anywhere." and "...they were so upset that they had to deport [her]."

Shows

Cancelled shows

External links 
Total World Tour on MusicBrainz

References 

2014 concert tours
2015 concert tours
2016 concert tours
2017 concert tours
2018 concert tours
2019 concert tours
Concert tours
21st-century concert tours
Concert tours of Africa
Concert tours of Asia
Concert tours of Europe
Concert tours of North America
Concert tours of Oceania
Concert tours of South America
Concert tours of South Africa
Concert tours of China
Concert tours of Japan
Concert tours of Malaysia
Concert tours of South Korea
Concert tours of Taiwan
Concert tours of Thailand
Concert tours of Austria
Concert tours of Belgium
Concert tours of Denmark
Concert tours of Estonia
Concert tours of Finland
Concert tours of France
Concert tours of Germany
Concert tours of Ireland
Concert tours of Italy
Concert tours of the Netherlands
Concert tours of Norway
Concert tours of Portugal
Concert tours of Spain
Concert tours of Sweden
Concert tours of Switzerland
Concert tours of the United Kingdom
Concert tours of Canada
Concert tours of Mexico
Concert tours of the United States
Concert tours of Australia
Concert tours of New Zealand
Concert tours of the United Arab Emirates
Concert tours of Russia